Fužine is a village and a municipality located in Primorje-Gorski Kotar County, 10 km away from the coast and 30 km away from the city of Rijeka. It is situated at 722 meters above sea level while being surrounded by mountains and three large artificial accumulation lakes (Bajer, Potkoš and Lepenica).

Demographics
The total population of Fužine municipality is 1,592, in the following settlements:
 Belo Selo, population 50
 Benkovac Fužinski, population 33
 Fužine, population 685
 Lič, population 504
 Slavica, population 33
 Vrata, population 287

History
Fužine was built in the 17th century when the House of Zrinski opened an iron mine in this area of Gorski Kotar. Fužine got its name from blacksmiths, because there were many blacksmiths in Fužine fixing carriages. Significant events include the 1727 construction of the Karolina road connecting Bakar with Karlovac, and the coming of the Zagreb-Rijeka railroad in 1873.

Tourism

Fužine has a long tourism tradition. A lot of people started to come to Fužine to get away from the city life. There are numerous bike routes and hiking trails in the mountains surrounding the village. The Vrelo cave is opened for tourist throughout whole year. The cave is also accessible for people with wheelchair, and other disabilities. 
Fužine also has a lot of festivities during the year:
 Summer in Fužine - concerts, sport competitions  
 Big New Year's Eve party in the noon
 Lake regatta
 World championship in underwater orientation
 Fishing contest

Industry

Fužine has a number of saw mills. It also contains a large plant (Drvenjača d.d.) for producing cellulose pulp for paper manufacturing.

Geography

There are three large man-made lakes (Bajer and Lepenica) and one small lake (Potkoš) in Fužine.

All the lakes are used for generating electricity. There is also a cave in Fužine named Vrelo.

The area is surrounded by the mountains of Tuhobić, Viševica, and Bitoraj.

Notable people
 Krešo Golik, movie maker
 Franjo Rački, historian
 Viktor Bubanj, general and National Hero of Yugoslavia
 Dario Knežević, football player
Vojislav Mišković, astronomer

References
2. 

3. 

4. 

Fužine, Croatia
Populated places in Primorje-Gorski Kotar County
Municipalities of Croatia